The 1999 season of 1. deild karla was the 45th season of second-tier football in Iceland.

Standings

Top scorers

References

1. deild karla (football) seasons
Iceland
Iceland
2